Sir Henry Walford Davies  (6 September 1869 – 11 March 1941) was an English composer, organist, and educator who held the title Master of the King's Music from 1934 until 1941. He served with the Royal Air Force during the First World War, during which he composed the Royal Air Force March Past, and was music adviser to the British Broadcasting Corporation, for whom he gave commended talks on music between 1924 and 1941.

Life and career

Early years
Henry Walford Davies was born in the Shropshire town of Oswestry close to the border with Wales.  He was the seventh of nine children of John Whitridge Davies and Susan, née Gregory, and the youngest of four surviving sons. It was a musical family: Davies senior, an accountant by profession was a keen amateur musician, who founded and conducted a choral society at Oswestry and was choirmaster of Christ Church Congregational church, at which Walford was a chorister. Two of  his other sons, Charlie and Harold, later held the post of organist at the church; the latter was professor of music at the University of Adelaide from 1919 to 1947. In 1882 Walford was accepted as a chorister at St George's Chapel, Windsor Castle, by the organist, Sir George Elvey.

When his voice broke in 1885 Davies left the choir and later that year was appointed organist of the Royal Chapel of All Saints, Windsor Great Park and was secretary to Elvey's successor, Walter Parratt, and Dean (later Archbishop) Randall Davidson. At this time British universities, including Cambridge, awarded "non-collegiate" music degrees to any applicant who could pass the necessary examinations. Davies entered for the Cambridge bachelor of music examinations in 1889, but his exercise (a cantata, The Future, to words by Matthew Arnold) failed. With the encouragement of Charles Villiers Stanford, professor of music at Cambridge, Davies made a second attempt; it was successful, and he graduated in 1891.

In 1890 Davies was awarded a scholarship in composition at the Royal College of Music (RCM), London, where he was a student until 1894. His teachers there were Hubert Parry and (for a single term) Stanford for composition, and W. S. Rockstro (counterpoint), Herbert Sharpe (piano) and Haydn Inwards (violin). While still at the RCM he was organist of St George's Church, Campden Hill, for three months, and St Anne's Church, Soho for a year until 1891, when he resigned for health reasons. In the following year was appointed organist of Christ Church, Hampstead; he remained there until 1897, holding the post in tandem for the last two years with an appointment from 1895 as teacher of counterpoint at the RCM in succession to Rockstro, a post that he held until 1903. He considered resigning the post in 1896, when he failed the counterpoint paper in the Cambridge examinations for the degree of doctor of music; he was successful at his second attempt, and the doctorate was conferred in March 1898.

National reputation
In May 1898 Davies was appointed organist and director of the choir at the Temple Church in the City of London, a post he retained until 1923. With this appointment, in the view of his biographer, Jeremy Dibble, Davies began to be seen as a prominent figure in British musical life. As an organist he became well known both as a soloist and as a teacher – the most celebrated of his pupils being Leopold Stokowski. As a conductor he directed the London Church Choir Association (1901–13) and succeeded Stanford at the Bach Choir (1902–07).

As a composer Davies achieved his most substantial success in 1904, with his cantata Everyman, based on the 15th century morality play of the same name. His friend and biographer H. C. Colles wrote, "[T]he music itself was not like anything he had written before or would write again.  Everyman was tumultuously received, and in the next few years given by every choral society in the country which aimed at a standard of firstrateness." The work was also given in Australia and the US.

During the First World War Davies joined the Committee for Music in War Time under Parry's chairmanship, organised concerts for the troops in France and musical events for the Fight for Right movement. In 1918 he was appointed director of music of the Royal Air Force, with the rank of major. He established the RAF School of Music and two RAF bands, and composed the "Royal Air Force March Past", to which a slow "trio" section was later added by his successor, Major George Dyson. Since 1930 Walford Davies' "Solemn Melody" has been one of the permanent selection of national airs and mourning music performed on Remembrance Sunday at The Cenotaph, Whitehall.

1919–41

In 1919 Davies accepted the professorship of music at University College, Aberystwyth, together with the post of director of music for the University of Wales and chairman of the National Council of Music. Here, in the words of his biographer Henry Ley, he "laboured unceasingly for the musical enlightenment of the principality", and in 1922 he was knighted in David Lloyd George's resignation honours.

In 1924 he gave the Cramb lectures at the University of Glasgow, gave his first broadcast talk for the BBC, and was appointed Gresham professor of music at the University of London. In the same year, at the age of fifty-four, he married (Constance) Margaret Isabel Evans (1898–1984), daughter of the Rev William Evans, Rector of Narberth, Pembrokeshire; she was his junior by twenty-eight years.

Davies wrote "God Be in My Head" and several other of his works at Witham Hall, which was then the private residence of Colonel Maitland, where he attended parties. Davies was the godfather of Bridget Lyons, who was the daughter of James W. Webb-Jones of St George's School, Windsor Castle, and who was the wife of the chorister Peter Stanley Lyons, who was subsequently the headmaster of Witham Hall School.

Davies resigned his professorship at Aberystwyth in 1926, when he was appointed by the BBC as a music adviser, but he remained chairman of the National Council of Music until his death. He was from 1927 to 1932 organist and director of St. George's Chapel, Windsor Castle.

Davies's BBC broadcast in April 1924 was the first of many he made between then and 1941. He became well known for his programmes "Music and the Ordinary Listener" (1926–9), his wartime broadcasts for children (1939–41), and "Everyman's Music" (1940–41). The Musical Times called him "one of the world's first great broadcasters"; The Times, in an obituary tribute said:

Colles wrote that Davies's regular listeners felt a proprietorial interest in him, recording one of them as remarking, "He always seemed to come right into the room with us."

On the death of Sir Edward Elgar in 1934, Davies was appointed to succeed him as Master of the King's Music. As musical adviser to the BBC Davies moved from London to Bristol when the BBC Symphony Orchestra and the corporation's music administration moved there on the outbreak of the Second World War in 1939.

Davies died at Wrington, near Bristol, on 11 March 1941, and was buried in the graveyard of Bristol Cathedral. His widow later married Julian Harold Legge Lambart, Lower Master at Eton College.

Compositions
(Incomplete list)

Orchestral

Choral and vocal

Chamber music

Notes, references and sources

Notes

References

Sources

External links
 
 

1869 births
1941 deaths
20th-century classical composers
20th-century English composers
Alumni of Fitzwilliam College, Cambridge
Alumni of the Royal College of Music
British military musicians
Cathedral organists
Classical music radio presenters
Composers awarded knighthoods
English classical composers
English classical organists
British male organists
English male classical composers
Knights Commander of the Royal Victorian Order
Masters of the King's Music
Military music composers
Officers of the Order of the British Empire
People educated at St George's School, Windsor Castle
People from Oswestry
Pupils of Charles Villiers Stanford
Royal Air Force musicians
20th-century British male musicians
Royal Air Force officers
Royal Air Force personnel of World War I
Oratorio composers
Male classical organists
BBC radio presenters
Presidents of the Independent Society of Musicians